The Texas dollar was the currency of the Republic of Texas. Several forms of currency were issued, but an ongoing economic depression made it difficult for the government to provide effective backing. The republic accepted the standard gold and silver coins of the United States, but never minted its own coins.

Negotiable promissory notes
During the Panic of 1837, the Texas Congress authorized the issue of interest-bearing promissory notes to pay expenses and sustain commerce. These notes were known as "star money" after the prominent five-pointed star printed on the front. They had to be passed by endorsement and therefore were held mainly as investments rather than public currency. Additional promissory notes issued in 1838 did not bear interest and depreciated rapidly.

Redbacks

"Redbacks" were bearer promissory notes issued between January 1839 and September 1840 by Mirabeau B. Lamar to fund the national debt during his presidency of the republic. Inflation, due mainly to overprinting, devalued the notes substantially, making 15 redbacks equal to one United States dollar. This debt of over  million was an important factor for annexation into the United States.

All these notes were issued from Austin. Many of the notes appear as orange-colored because of the quality of the ink. Several people have suggested that the “burnt orange” color of The University of Texas at Austin came from this coloring, but it cannot be proven.

The government cut-cancelled redbacks and change upon redemption to keep them from being fraudulently redeemed again. The cancelled notes are highly sought after by collectors. A few notes were never redeemed or cut-cancelled; those notes are valued more highly. Two early Republic of Texas heroes are found on redbacks. Both had died prior to the issuance of the notes. Deaf Smith is found on the  redback, while the "Father of Texas," Stephen F. Austin, is found on the  note.

Congress acknowledged the redbacks' collapse in 1842 by refusing to accept them at face value for payment of taxes. Texans increasingly relied on United States currency, shinplasters and private obligations.

Exchequer bills
The end of the redback coincided with the presidency of John Tyler in the United States, who had proposed a regulated paper money system called the Exchequer plan. Upon resuming the Texas presidency, Sam Houston attempted to restore the negotiable note system under the name of "exchequer bills." This effort had little success until the following year, when economic conditions throughout North  America began to improve. By 1845 the bills were passing at par value.

Under the Compromise of 1850, Texas was given  million for all the land it had claimed outside its present state boundary. With this money, Texas paid off all its debts, including the redemption of its notes.

See also 

 Greenback

References

External links 
 Pictures of redbacks from the Texas State Library
 
 Money of the Republic of Texas (Texas State Historical Association)
 Texas State Library and Archives Commission—Currency pictures (a PDF file)
 Images of Redbacks from the Rowe-Barr Collection of Texas Currency, DeGolyer Library, SMU.

Modern obsolete currencies
1839 establishments in the Republic of Texas
1840 disestablishments
Republic of Texas
Currencies of North America
Historical currencies of the United States